Echthistatus spinulosus is a species of beetle in the family Cerambycidae. It was described by Francis Polkinghorne Pascoe in 1862. It is known from Mexico.

References

Parmenini
Beetles described in 1862